SeaQuest Interactive Aquariums, branded as SeaQuest, is an Idaho-based interactive marine life attraction chain. It is owned and operated by Vince Covino, who is the brother of Ammon Covino whom was sent to prison for illegally fishing for animals for at their aquarium. Once Ammon was released they opened a new aquarium,  SeaQuest.  The company provides animals in touch tanks and through marine-themed children's birthday parties at shopping malls throughout the United States. Providing animals that interact for food. The company has locations in Utah, Texas, Las Vegas, New Jersey, California, Connecticut, Minnesota, Colorado, Virginia, and Georgia. SeaQuest has attracted considerable controversy and legal issues due to concerns over its animal care standards.

History
SeaQuest was established in 2015 by Vince Covino and Ammon Convino after Ammon got out of prison for illegally fishing for ocean life for their previous aquarium.   Prior to the launch of SeaQuest, Covino had opened several standalone aquariums beginning with the Idaho Aquarium in 2011 (changed ownership 2014), Portland Aquarium in 2012 (closed 2016), the Austin Aquarium in 2013 and the San Antonio Aquarium in 2014. SeaQuest offers interactive experiences with visitors by allowing guests the option to touch, hold, and feed animals.
 Although similar to its sister aquariums, SeaQuest locations are usually housed within shopping malls.

Locations
SeaQuest has ten locations across America.

 Folsom, California
 Fort Worth, Texas
 Las Vegas, Nevada
 Layton, Utah
 Littleton, Colorado
 Lynchburg, Virginia
 Roseville, Minnesota
 Trumbull, Connecticut
 Woodbridge, New Jersey
 Stonecrest, Georgia

Violations and controversies
SeaQuest has been subject to boycott and protests by animal-rights advocates such as PETA and actor Alec Baldwin, who blocked an aquarium from being constructed on Long Island. In addition, SeaQuest has been the subject of numerous violations and controversies at its various locations.

Littleton, Colorado  
Colorado Parks and Wildlife suspended SeaQuest's exhibitor's license for two years due to an abundance of egregious violations related to the animals' welfare at the facility.
In 2019, a sloth named Flash was burned by a heat lamp on two occasions resulting in significant burns to its face. The employee responsible for the animal's care was charged with cruelty-to-animals, but was found not guilty.
In 2018, Colorado Parks and Wildlife cited and fined SeaQuest for failing to report the death of a regulated kookaburra and issued warnings for the unlawful importation and possession of six wood ducks, unlawful importation of a caiman and wallaby, five counts of failing to report injuries to humans, and failing to report the deaths of 250 trout.
In 2018, SeaQuest failed a Colorado Department of Agriculture pre-license inspection. Issues included illegal transfer of koi fish, unsanitary conditions, and allowing visitors to walk through the aviary while birds were grounded, creating a precarious environment where the birds were vulnerable to being stepped on.
Additional events in 2018 included SeaQuest storing approximately 80 parakeets in an employee's garage after the company was ordered to shut down the interactive aviary, and a state fine for SeaQuest's unlawful procurement of a two-toed sloth and failure to obtain an appropriate license for the animal.
Approximately 30 injuries involving animal-to-human bites were reported to occur between June 2018 and January 2019.

Las Vegas, Nevada
In 2019, Clark County Administrative Services suspended SeaQuest's exotic-animal permit because the facility held unpermitted otters and coatimundi. The agency imposed a $2,000 fine due to an Asian small-clawed otter dying after being caught in a water pool filtration system, and imposed an additional $2,000 fine for unpermitted animal breeding of Asian small-clawed otters.
In 2018, a capybara named Wesley escaped while en route to a veterinary office and was injured in the process.

Fort Worth, Texas
In 2019, the United States Department of Agriculture cited SeaQuest for failing to reduce the risk of injury to visitors during public encounters with an Asian small-clawed otter.

Ammon Covino
Ammon Covino is the brother of Vince Covino and does not have any ownership in SeaQuest Interactive Aquariums. The brothers were partners in some prior aquarium businesses. Ammon has been subject of some controversies. 

Beginning in 2012, Ammon was indicted for the illegal harvesting and trafficking of the Lemon shark (Negaprion brevirostris) and Spotted eagle ray (Aetobatus narinari) in the Florida Keys. Both species are listed as 'near threatened' on the International Union for Conservation of Nature Red List. Ammon pleaded guilty to the charges of conspiracy to illegally purchase and sell fish and wildlife, resulting in a sentencing of one year plus probation.

In February 2016, Ammon violated parole by failing to “answer truthfully all inquiries by his probation officer”, leading to an additional sentence of 30 days in jail and a court mandated fine of $50,000 to the National Fish and Wildlife Foundation.

In November 2016, Ammon was sentenced to be incarcerated for an additional eight months and an 1 year of supervised release for violating court-imposed employment restrictions of involvement with the construction of SeaQuest in Las Vegas, Nevada and Layton, Utah.

References

Companies based in Idaho
Tourist attractions in the United States
2015 establishments in the United States
Aquaria in the United States
Zoos in the United States